Gregory of Nyssa, also known as Gregory Nyssen (c. 335 – c. 395), was Bishop of Nyssa in Cappadocia from 372 to 376 and from 378 until his death in 395. He is venerated as a saint in Catholicism, Eastern Orthodoxy, Oriental Orthodoxy, Anglicanism, and Lutheranism. Gregory, his elder brother Basil of Caesarea, and their friend Gregory of Nazianzus are collectively known as the Cappadocian Fathers.

Gregory lacked the administrative ability of his brother Basil or the contemporary influence of Gregory of Nazianzus, but he was an erudite Christian theologian who made significant contributions to the doctrine of the Trinity and the Nicene Creed. Gregory's philosophical writings were influenced by Origen. Since the mid-twentieth century, there has been a significant increase in interest in Gregory's works from the academic community, particularly involving universal salvation, which has resulted in challenges to many traditional interpretations of his theology.

Background
The Book of Acts depicts that on the Day of Pentecost there were visiting Jews who were "residents of ...Cappadocia" in attendance. In the First Epistle of Peter, written after AD 65, the author greets Christians who are "exiles scattered throughout…Cappadocia". There is no further reference to Cappadocia in the rest of the New Testament.

Early Christianity arose in Cappadocia relatively late, with no evidence of a Christian community before the late second century AD. Alexander of Jerusalem was the first bishop of the province in the early to mid third century, a period in which Christians suffered persecution from the local Roman authorities. The community remained very small throughout the third century: when Gregory Thaumaturgus acceded to the bishopric in c. 250, according to his namesake, the Nyssen, there were only seventeen members of the Church in Caesarea.

Cappadocian bishops were among those at the First Council of Nicaea. Because of the broad distribution of the population, rural bishops [χωρεπισκοποι] were appointed to support the Bishop of Caesarea. During the late fourth century there were around 50 of them. In Gregory's lifetime, the Christians of Cappadocia were devout, with the veneration of the Forty Martyrs of Sebaste and Saint George being particularly significant and represented by a considerable monastic presence. There were some adherents of heretical branches of Christianity, most notably Arians, Encratites and Messalians.

Biography

Early life and education 
Gregory was born around 335, probably in or near the city of Neocaesarea, Pontus. His family was aristocratic and Christian—according to Gregory of Nazianzus, his mother was Emmelia of Caesarea, and his father, a rhetorician, has been identified either as Basil the Elder or as a Gregory. Among his eight siblings were St. Macrina the Younger, St. Naucratius, St. Peter of Sebaste and St. Basil of Caesarea. The precise number of children in the family was historically contentious: the commentary on 30 May in the Acta Sanctorum, for example, initially states that they were nine, before describing Peter as the tenth child. It has been established that this confusion occurred due to the death of one son in infancy, leading to ambiguities in Gregory's own writings. Gregory's parents had suffered persecution for their faith: he writes that they "had their goods confiscated for confessing Christ." Gregory's paternal grandmother, Macrina the Elder. is also revered as a saint and his maternal grandfather was a martyr, as Gregory put it "killed by Imperial wrath" under the persecution of the Roman Emperor Maximinus II. Between the 320s to the early 340s, the family rebuilt its fortunes, with Gregory's father working in the city of Neocaesarea as an advocate and rhetorician.

Gregory's temperament is said to have been quiet and meek, in contrast to his brother Basil who was known to be much more outspoken. Gregory was first educated at home, by his mother Emmelia and sister Macrina. Little is known of what further education he received. Apocryphal hagiographies depict him studying at Athens, but this is speculation probably based on the life of his brother Basil. It seems more likely that he continued his studies in Caesarea, where he read classical literature, philosophy and perhaps medicine. Gregory himself claimed that his only teachers were Basil, "Paul, John and the rest of the Apostles and prophets".

He did, however, act as a lector. He is known to have married a woman named Theosebia during this period, who is sometimes identified with Theosebia the Deaconess, venerated as a saint by Orthodox Christianity. This is controversial, however, and other commentators suggest that Theosebia the Deaconess was one of Gregory's sisters.

Episcopate 
In 371, the Emperor Valens split Cappadocia into two new provinces, Cappadocia Prima and Cappadocia Secunda. This resulted in complex changes in ecclesiastical boundaries, during which several new bishoprics were created. Gregory was elected bishop of the new see of Nyssa in 372, presumably with the support of his brother Basil, who was metropolitan of Caesarea. Gregory's early policies as bishop often went against those of Basil; for instance, while his brother condemned the Sabellianist followers of Marcellus of Ancyra as heretics, Gregory may have tried to reconcile them with the church.

Gregory faced opposition to his reign in Nyssa and, in 373, Amphilochius, bishop of Iconium, had to visit the city to quell discontent. In 375, Desmothenes of Pontus convened a synod at Ancyra to try Gregory on charges of embezzlement of church funds and irregular ordination of bishops. He was arrested by imperial troops in the winter of the same year, but escaped to an unknown location. The synod of Nyssa, which was convened in the spring of 376, deposed him. However, Gregory regained his see in 378, perhaps due to an amnesty promulgated by the new emperor, Gratian. In the same year Basil died, and despite the relative unimportance of Nyssa, Gregory took over many of his brother's former responsibilities in Pontus.

He was present at the Synod of Antioch in April 379, where he unsuccessfully attempted to reconcile the followers of Meletius of Antioch with those of Paulinus. After visiting the village of Annisa to see his dying sister Macrina, he returned to Nyssa in August. In 380 he travelled to Sebaste, in the province of Armenia Prima, to support a pro-Nicene candidate for the election to the bishopric. To his surprise, he himself was elected to the seat, perhaps due to the population's association of him with his brother. However, Gregory deeply disliked the relatively unhellenized society of Armenia, and he was confronted by an investigation into his orthodoxy by local opponents of the Nicene theology. After a stay of several months, a substitute was found—possibly Gregory's brother Peter, who was bishop of Sebaste from 381—and Gregory returned home to Nyssa to write books I and II of Against Eunomius.

Gregory participated in the First Council of Constantinople (381), and perhaps gave there his famous sermon In suam ordinationem. He was chosen to eulogise at the funeral of Meletius, which occurred during the council. The council sent Gregory on a mission to Arabia, perhaps to ameliorate the situation in Bostra where two men, Agapius and Badagius, claimed to be bishop. If this is the case, Gregory was unsuccessful, as the see was still contested in 394. He then travelled to Jerusalem where Cyril of Jerusalem faced opposition from local clergy due to the fact that he had been ordained by Acacius of Caesarea, an Arian heretic. Gregory's attempted mediation of the dispute was unsuccessful, and he himself was accused of holding unorthodox views on the nature of Christ. His later reign in Nyssa was marked by conflict with his metropolitan, Helladius. Gregory was present at a 394 synod convened at Constantinople to discuss the continued problems in Bostra. The year of his death is unknown.

Theology 
The traditional view of Gregory is that he was an orthodox Trinitarian theologian, who was influenced by the Neoplatonism of Plotinus and believed in universal salvation following Origen. However, as a highly original and sophisticated thinker, Gregory is difficult to classify, and many aspects of his theology are contentious among both conservative Eastern Orthodox theologians and Western academic scholarship. This is often due to the lack of systematic structure and the presence of terminological inconsistencies in Gregory's work.

Conception of the Trinity
Gregory, following Basil, defined the Trinity as "one essence [οὐσία] in three persons [ὑποστάσεις]", the formula adopted by the Council of Constantinople in 381. Like the other Cappadocian Fathers, he was a homoousian, and Against Eunomius affirms the truth of the consubstantiality of the trinity over Eunomius' Aristotelian belief that the Father's substance is unengendered, whereas the Son's is engendered. According to Gregory, the differences between the three persons of the Trinity reside in their differing hypostatic origin, and the triune nature of God is revealed through divine action (despite the unity of God in His action). The Son is therefore defined as begotten of the Father, the Holy Spirit as proceeding from the Father, and the Father by his role as progenitor. However, this doctrine would seem to subordinate the Son to the Father, and the Holy Spirit to the Son. Robert Jenson suggests that Gregory implies that each member of the Godhead has an individual priority: the Son has epistemological priority, the Father has ontic priority and the Spirit has metaphysical priority. Other commentators disagree: Morwenna Ludlow, for instance, argues that epistemic priority resides primarily in the Spirit in Gregory's theology.

Modern proponents of social trinitarianism often claim to have been influenced by the Cappadocians' dynamic picture of the Trinity. However, it would be fundamentally incorrect to identify Gregory as a social Trinitarian, as his theology emphasises the unity of God's will, and he clearly believes that the identities of the Trinity are the three persons, not the relations between them.

Infinitude of God

Gregory was one of the first theologians to argue, in opposition to Origen, that God is infinite. His main argument for the infinity of God, found in Against Eunomius, is that God's goodness is limitless, and as God's goodness is essential, God is also limitless.

An important consequence of Gregory's belief in the infinity of God is his belief that God, as limitless, is essentially incomprehensible to the limited minds of created beings. In Life of Moses, Gregory writes: "...every concept that comes from some comprehensible image, by an approximate understanding and by guessing at the Divine nature, constitutes an idol of God and does not proclaim God." Gregory's theology was thus apophatic: he proposed that God should be defined in terms of what we know He is not rather than what we might speculate Him to be.

Accordingly, the Nyssen taught that due to God's infinitude, a created being can never reach an understanding of God, and thus for man in both life and the afterlife there is a constant progression [ἐπέκτασις] towards the unreachable knowledge of God, as the individual continually transcends all which has been reached before. In the Life of Moses, Gregory speaks of three stages of this spiritual growth: initial darkness of ignorance, then spiritual illumination, and finally a darkness of the mind in mystic contemplation of the God who cannot be comprehended.

Universalism
Gregory seems to have believed in the universal salvation of all human beings. Gregory argues that when Paul says that God will be "all in all" (1 Cor. 15:28), this means that though some may need to undergo a long period of purification, eventually "no being will remain outside the number of the saved" and that "no being created by God will fall outside the Kingdom of God". Due to the unity of human nature in Christ "all, thanks to the union with one another, will be joined in communion with the Good, in Jesus Christ Our Lord". By his incarnation, death and resurrection Christ achieves "the common salvation of human nature".

Gregory also described God's work this way: "His [God's] end is one, and one only; it is this: when the complete whole of our race shall have been perfected from the first man to the last—some having at once in this life been cleansed from evil, others having afterwards in the necessary periods been healed by the Fire, others having in their life here been unconscious equally of good and of evil—to offer to every one of us participation in the blessings which are in Him, which, the Scripture tells us, 'eye hath not seen, nor ear heard,' nor thought ever reached." That this is what Gregory believed and taught is affirmed by most scholars. A minority of scholars have argued that Gregory only affirmed the universal resurrection.

In the Life of Moses, Gregory writes that just as the darkness left the Egyptians after three days, perhaps redemption [ἀποκατάστασις] will be extended to those suffering in hell [γέεννα]. This salvation may not only extend to humans; following Origen, there are passages where he seems to suggest (albeit through the voice of Macrina) that even the demons will have a place in Christ's "world of goodness". Gregory's interpretations of 1 Corinthians 15:28 ("And when all things shall be subdued unto him ...") and Philippians 2:10 ("That at the name of Jesus every knee should bow, of things in heaven, and things in earth, and things under the earth") support this understanding of his theology.

Nevertheless, in the Great Catechism, Gregory suggests that while every human will be resurrected, salvation will only be accorded to the baptised, although he also states that others driven by their passions can be saved after being purified by fire. While he believes that there will be no more evil in the hereafter, it is arguable that this does not preclude a belief that God might justly damn sinners for eternity. Thus, the main difference between Gregory's conception of ἀποκατάστασις and that of Origen would be that Gregory believes that mankind will be collectively returned to sinlessness, whereas Origen believes that personal salvation will be universal. This interpretation of Gregory has been criticized recently, however. Indeed, this interpretation is explicitly contradicted  in the "Great Catechism" itself, for at the end of chapter XXXV Gregory declares that those who have not been purified by water through baptism will be purified by fire in the end, so that "their nature may be restored pure again to God". On the contrary, Saint Gregory also affirms that "without the laver of regeneration it is impossible for the man to be in the resurrection", meaning that the salvation will not be universal. Furthermore, in the next chapter (ch. XXXVI), Gregory says that those who are purified from evil will be admitted into the "heavenly company".

Attempting to reconcile these disparate positions, Eastern Orthodox theologian Dr. Mario Baghos notes that "when taken at face value the saint seems to be contradicting himself in these passages; on the one hand he asserted the salvation of all and the complete eradication of evil, and, on the other, that the fire needed to purge evil is 'sleepless', i.e. everlasting. The only solution to this inconsistency is to view any allusion to universal salvation in St Gregory as an expression of God's intention for humanity, which is in fact attested to when his holy sister states that God has "one goal ... some straightway even in this life purified from evil, others healed hereafter through fire for the appropriate length of time." That we can choose either to accept or ignore this purification is confirmed by the saint's many exhortations that we freely undertake the virtuous path." Dr. Ilaria Ramelli has made the observation that for Gregory free will was compatible with universal salvation, since every person would eventually accept the good having gone through purification. Nevertheless, some interpret Gregory as conceding that Judas and similar sinners will never be completely purified when he wrote, "that which never existed is to be preferred to that which has existed in such sin. For, as to the latter, on account of the depth of the ingrained evil, the chastisement in the way of purgation will be extended into infinity". However, Ramelli renders the original Greek "εἰς ἄπειρον παρατείνεται ἡ διὰ τῆς καθάρσεως κόλασις" as "the punishment provided for the purpose of purification will tend to an indefinite duration."
Additional sources are needed to interpret correctly the questioned chapter.

Anthropology
Gregory's anthropology is founded on the ontological distinction between the created and uncreated. Man is a material creation, and thus limited, but infinite in that his immortal soul has an indefinite capacity to grow closer to the divine. Gregory believed that the soul is created simultaneous to the creation of the body (in opposition to Origen, who believed in preexistence), and that embryos were thus persons. To Gregory, the human being is exceptional, being created in the image of God. Humanity is theomorphic both in having self-awareness and free will, the latter which gives each individual existential power, because to Gregory, in disregarding God one negates one's own existence. In the Song of Songs, Gregory metaphorically describes human lives as paintings created by apprentices to a master: the apprentices (the human wills) imitate their master's work (the life of Christ) with beautiful colors (virtues), and thus man strives to be a reflection of Christ. Gregory, in stark contrast to most thinkers of his age, saw great beauty in the Fall: from Adam's sin from two perfect humans would eventually arise myriad.

Slavery
Gregory was among the early Christian voices to write against slavery, declaring the institution inherently sinful.

Gregory used Plato's definition of virtue as ‘something that admits of no master [ἀδέσποτον‎]’ in the service of his own theological arguments against slavery: (1) each human is an image of God and therefore free, (2) the equality of all humans reflects the equality of the divine Persons and (3) just as the divine nature cannot be divided into slavery (δουλεία‎) and mastery (δυναστεία‎, κυριότης‎), neither can human nature; the whole creation is a slave, but of God alone.

Although the stoic Seneca had criticized cruel slave masters and advised slave masters to treat slaves with kindness (or at least those of good character), the stoics never questioned the institution of slavery, which was considered an ordinary part of daily life in the ancient world. Gregory of Nyssa's critique was the first and only sustained critique of the institution of slavery itself made in the ancient world.

Neoplatonism
There are many similarities between Gregory's theology and neoplatonist philosophy, especially that of Plotinus. Specifically, they share the idea that the reality of God is completely inaccessible to human beings and that man can only come to see God through a spiritual journey in which knowledge [γνῶσις] is rejected in favour of meditation. Gregory does not refer to any neoplatonist philosophers in his work, and there is only one disputed passage which may directly quote Plotinus. Considering this, it seems possible that Gregory was familiar with Plotinus and perhaps other figures in neoplatonism. However, some significant differences between neoplatonism and Gregory's thought exist, such as Gregory's statement that beauty and goodness are equivalent, which contrasts with Plotinus' view that they are two different qualities. However Plotinus does say "And Beauty, this Beauty which is also the Good" implying the Platonist One which is the Good is also Beauty.

Eastern Orthodox theologians are generally critical of the theory that Gregory was influenced by neoplatonism. For example, Metropolitan Hierotheos of Nafpaktos argues in Life After Death that Gregory opposed all philosophical (as opposed to theological) endeavour as tainted with worldliness. This view is supported by Against Eunomius, where Gregory denounces Eunomius for placing the results of his systematic Aristotelean philosophy above the traditional teachings of the Church.

Feast day 
The Eastern Orthodox and Eastern Catholic Churches commemorate Gregory of Nyssa on 10 January. The Roman Martyrology and the Episcopal Church commemorate his death on 9 March. In modern Roman Catholic calendars which include the feast of St. Gregory, such as the Benedictines, his feast day is observed on 10 January. The Lutheran Church–Missouri Synod commemorates Gregory along with the other Cappadocian Fathers on 10 January.

Gregory is remembered (with Macrina) in the Church of England with a lesser festival on 19 July.

Legacy 

Gregory is revered as a saint. However, unlike the other Cappadocian fathers, he is not a Doctor of the Church. He is venerated chiefly in the East. His relics were held by the Vatican until 2000, when a portion of them were translated to the Greek Orthodox church of St. Gregory of Nyssa, San Diego, California.

Professor of theology, Natalie Carnes wrote: "One reason Gregory was not taken up into the theological stream in the West is that he was little translated into Latin. John Scotus Eriugena (c. 800–c. 877) should be greatly credited for the influence Gregory did have. Not only was Eriugena himself influenced by Gregory, but he also translated On the Making of the Human into Latin."

Gregory's work received little scholarly attention in the West until the mid-twentieth century, and he was historically treated as a minor figure in comparison to Basil the Great or Gregory of Nazianzus. As late as 1942, Hans Urs von Balthasar wrote that his work was virtually unknown. However, the 6th-century Latin translation of De opificio hominis by Dionysius Exiguus was very widespread in the Medieval period, and Francisco Bastitta Harriet argues that Nyssen's conceptions of indeterminate human nature and ontological freedom were among the core influences on Renaissance anthropology, particularly on the works of Nicholas of Cusa and Giovanni Pico della Mirandola. "The renewed enthusiasm of 15th-century philosophers and humanists for classical antiquity also led to a revival of the study and translation of Greek patristic works. Against this background, some of Gregory of Nyssa’s works which remained unknown to the West during the medieval centuries received their first Latin translations by leading representatives of Italian and Byzantine culture." These include the early Renaissance translations of De vita Moysis by George of Trebizond in 1446, of De vita Macrinae and De anima et resurrectione by Pietro Balbi between 1465 and 1473, and of De oratione dominica by the Byzantine scholar Athanasius Chalkeopoulos around 1465.

In part due to the scholarship of Balthasar and Jean Daniélou, by the 1950s Gregory had become the subject of much serious theological research, with a critical edition of his work published (Gregorii Nysseni Opera), and the founding of the International Colloquium on Gregory of Nyssa. This attention has continued to the present day. Modern studies have focused on Gregory's eschatology rather than his more dogmatic writings, and he has gained a reputation as an unconventional thinker whose thought arguably prefigures postmodernism. Major figures in contemporary research include Sarah Coakley, John Zizioulas and Robert Jenson. In 2003, theologian David Bentley Hart published a book seemingly influenced by Gregory.

Commentary on Gregory
In 787 AD, the Second Council of Nicea, the seventh Ecumenical Council of the Church, honored Gregory of Nyssa:
Let us then, consider who were the venerable doctors and indomitable champions of the Church [including] Gregory Primate of Nyssa, who all have called the father of fathers.
Henry Fairfield Osborn wrote in his work on the history of evolutionary thought, From the Greeks to Darwin (1894):
Among the Christian Fathers the movement towards a partly naturalistic interpretation of the order of Creation was made by Gregory of Nyssa in the fourth century, and was completed by Augustine in the fourth and fifth centuries. ...[Gregory] taught that Creation was potential. God imparted to matter its fundamental properties and laws. The objects and completed forms of the Universe developed gradually out of chaotic material.

Anthony Meredith writes of Gregory's mystical and apophatic writings in his book Gregory of Nyssa (The Early Church Fathers) (1999): 
Gregory has often been credited with the discovery of mystical theology, or rather with the perception that darkness is an appropriate symbol under which God can be discussed. There is much truth in this....Gregory seems to have been the first Christian writer to have made this important point.
J. Kameron Carter writes about Gregory's stance on slavery, in the book Race a Theological Account (2008):

What interests me is the defining features of Gregory's vision of the just society: his unequivocal stance against 'the peculiar institution of slavery' and his call for the manumission of all slaves. I am interested in reading Gregory as a fourth century abolitionist intellectual....His outlook surpassed not only St. Paul's more moderate (but to be fair to Paul, in his moment, revolutionary) stance on the subject but also those of all ancient intellectuals -- Pagan, Jewish and Christian - from Aristotle to Cicero and from Augustine in the Christian West to his contemporary, the golden mouthed preacher himself, John Crysotom in the East. Indeed, the world would have to wait another fifteen centuries -- until the nineteenth century, late into the modern abolitionist movement -- before such an unequivocal stance against slavery would appear again.

Catholic theologian and author Hans Urs von Balthasar, describes Gregory in his book Presence and Thought: An Essay on the Religious Philosophy of Gregory of Nyssa (1988):Less prolific than Origen, less cultivated than Gregory Nazianzen, less practical than Basil, Gregory of Nyssa nonetheless outstrips them all in the profundity of his thought.

Bibliography
The complete works of Gregory of Nyssa are published in the original Greek with Latin commentary as Gregorii Nysseni Opera:
Vol. 1 - 
Vol. 2 - 
Vol. 3/1 - 
Vol. 3/2 - 
Vol. 3/3 - Opera dogmatica minora, pars III - De Anima Et Resurrectione, 2014 Publisher=Brill  Editor: Andreas Spira
Vol. 3/4 - 
Vol. 3/5 - 
Vol. 4/1 - 
Vol. 4/2 - Opera exegetica In Genesim, pars II - currently unavailable.
Vol. 5 - 
Vol. 6 - 
Vol. 7/1 - 
Vol. 7/2 - 
Vol. 8/1 - 
Vol. 8/2 - 
Vol. 9 - 
Vol. 10/1 - 
Vol. 10/2 - 

The following are editions of English translations of Gregory's writings;
Gregory of Nyssa, Homilies on Ecclesiastes: An English Version with Supporting Studies. Proceedings of the Seventh International Colloquium on Gregory of Nyssa (St Andrews, 5–10 September 1990). Link.

References

Sources

Further reading
Gregory of Nyssa, Life of Macrina, London, 2012. limovia.net 

Metropolitan Hierotheos of Nafpaktos, Life after Death . Retrieved 22 January 2012.

External links
 Ancient Greek OCR of Gregory of Nyssa's writings in PG at the Lace repository of Mount Allison University: vol. 45 , vol. 46 
 Gregory of Nyssa works 
 Gregory of Nyssa Home Page, including many English translations of his writings.
 Gregory of Nissa  English translación of writings.
 
 Gregory of Nyssa entry from The Internet Encyclopedia of Philosophy
 Opera Omnia by Migne, Patrologia Graeca with analytical indexes.
 Schaff's Nicene and Post-Nicene Fathers (online), including the works of St. Gregory
 "Commentary on Song of Songs; Letter on the Soul; Letter on Ascesis and the Monastic Life', a manuscript from the 14th-century of Gregory of Nyssa's work, translated into Arabic
 

330s births
395 deaths
4th-century bishops in Roman Anatolia
4th-century Christian mystics
4th-century Christian saints
4th-century Christian theologians
4th-century philosophers
Byzantine saints
Christian clerical marriage
Church Fathers
Doctors of the Church
Catholic philosophers
Christian universalist theologians
Saints from Roman Anatolia
Cappadocian Greeks
People from Niksar
Christian abolitionists
Anglican saints